Alexei Arbuzov (1792–1861) was an Imperial Russian general of the infantry and division commander. He fought in wars against the First French Empire and the Ottoman Empire. He took part in suppressing the uprising in Poland. He was the maternal grandfather of Nikolai Velyaminov and Natalia Nordman.

Awards 
 Order of Saint Anna, 4th class
 Order of Saint Anna, 2nd class
 Order of Saint Anna, 1st class
 Order of Saint Vladimir, 4th class
 Order of Saint George, 4th degree

Sources 
 
 Арбузов, Алексей Федорович // [Аральская флотилия — Афонское сражение]. — Санкт-Петербург ; Москва] : Типография т-ва И. Д. Сытина, 1911. — С. 3—4. — (Военная энциклопедия : [в 18 т.] / под ред. В. Ф. Новицкого ... [и других:  А. В. фон-Шварца, В. А. Апушкина, Г. К. фон-Шульца] ; 1911–1915, т. 3).
 Гоувальт. История лейб-гвардии Павловского полка. СПб., 1852. на сайте Руниверс
 Русский биографический словарь: В 25 т. / под наблюдением А. А. Половцова. 1896–1918.

1792 births
1861 deaths
Imperial Russian Army generals
Russian people of the November Uprising
Recipients of the Order of St. Anna, 4th class
Recipients of the Order of St. Anna, 2nd class
Recipients of the Order of St. Anna, 1st class
Recipients of the Order of St. Vladimir, 4th class
Russian nobility